Jihe Expressway is a  Chinese ring expressway that connects Bao'an International Airport and He'ao Community of Longgang District in Shenzhen, Guangdong, China. It connects to the Shenzhen-Shantou Expressway, Huizhou-Yantian Expressway, G205, Meilin-Guanlan Expressway, Guangzhou-Shenzhen-Zhuhai Expressway, G107, Guangzhou-Foshan Expressway, and the Foshan-Kaiyang Expressway.

History
The first section of the expressway opened in the east of Shenzhen on 31 December 1997, from Fumin Community of Bao'an District to He'ao Community of Longgang District. And the second section of the expressway opened in the west of Shenzhen in May 1999, from Bao'an International Airport to Fumin Community.

References

Expressways in Shenzhen
Bao'an District
Longgang District, Shenzhen